The UWN Tag Team Championship is the top tag team championship sanctioned and governed by the United Wrestling Network and used in Championship Wrestling from Hollywood.  It was awarded to Timothy Thatcher and Drew Gulak as they were the reigning CWFH Heritage Tag Team Champions. The current champions are TMDK (Shane Haste and Bad Dude Tito), who are in their first reign as champions.

Title history

Reigns

Combined reigns

By team

By wrestler

See also
CWFH Heritage Tag Team Championship

References

External links

United Wrestling Network championships
Tag team wrestling championships